The Ministry of Development and Investment is a government department of Greece. The current minister is Adonis Georgiadis, Vice President of New Democracy.

History
The Ministry of the Economy, Competitiveness and Shipping (Υπουργείο Οικονομίας, Ανταγωνιστικότητας και Ναυτιλίας) was created on 7 October 2009 from the break-up of the unified Economy and Finance Ministry (Υπουργείο Οικονομίας και Οικονομικών), and the merger of what had constituted the old National Economy Ministry (Υπουργείο Εθνικής Οικονομίας) with the Ministry of Development (Υπουργείο Ανάπτυξης) and the Mercantile Marine Ministry (Υπουργείο Εμπορικής Ναυτιλίας).

On 7 September 2010, it was renamed the Ministry of Regional Development and Competitiveness (Υπουργείο Περιφερειακής Ανάπτυξης και Ανταγωνιστικότητας) to reflect the impending re-establishment of a separate Ministry of Maritime Affairs, Islands and Fisheries. However, no Presidential Decree was issued to formalize the renaming, and the ministry retained its earlier official name despite the loss of the shipping portfolio on 30 September. After the reincorporation of the latter on 27 June 2011, it was renamed the Ministry of Development, Competitiveness and Shipping (Υπουργείο Ανάπτυξης, Ανταγωνιστικότητας και Ναυτιλίας). On 21 June 2012, it was split again from the Ministry of Shipping and merged instead with the Ministry of Infrastructure, Transport and Networks to become the Ministry of Development, Competitiveness, Infrastructure, Transport and Networks. The merger was reversed following a cabinet reshuffle on 25 June 2013, but following the formation of the Tsipras Cabinet on 27 January 2015 all three ministries were amalgamated into the Ministry of the Economy, Infrastructure, Shipping and Tourism. Οn 23 September 2015, it was renamed the Ministry of the Economy, Development and Tourism upon the restoration of the infrastructure and shipping ministries. On 5 November 2016, it was renamed the Ministry of the Economy and Development upon the restoration of the Ministry of Tourism. On 9 July 2019, it was renamed the Ministry of Development and Investment by the incoming New Democracy government.

List of National Economy Ministers (1982–2000)

List of Economy and Finance Ministers (2000–2009)

List of Ministers for the Economy, Competitiveness and Shipping (2009–2010)

List of Ministers for Regional Development and Competitiveness (2010–2011)

List of Ministers for Development, Competitiveness and Shipping (2011–2012)

List of Ministers for Development, Competitiveness, Infrastructure, Transport and Networks (2012–2013)

List of Ministers for Development and Competitiveness (2013–15)

List of Ministers for the Economy, Infrastructure, Shipping and Tourism (2015)

List of Ministers for the Economy, Development and Tourism (2015–2016)

List of Ministers for the Economy and Development (2016–2019)

List of Ministers for Development and Investment (since July 2019)

References

External links

1982 establishments in Greece
Development and Investment
Economy, Development and Tourism
Economy of Greece